Velo Sound Station is a Pakistani television programme and music show which features live studio-recorded music performances by veteran and emerging artists. The show is directed by Bilal Maqsood and Yasir Jaswal, former is also the executive producer of the show. The first episode of Velo Sound Station aired on 20 November 2020.

Artists

Featured Artist 

 Aag (band)
 Abdullah Qureshi
 Aima Baig
 Atif Aslam
 Meesha Shafi
 Natasha Noorani
 Nighat Chaudhry
 Sajjad Ali
 Sara Haider
 Shamoon Ismail
 Umair Jaswal
 Uzair Jaswal
 Strings
 Takatak

Episodes

See also

 Music of Pakistan
 Coke Studio
 Nescafé Basement
 Uth Records
 Acoustic Station
 Bisconni Music

References

External links 

 
 
 

2020 Pakistani television series debuts
Pakistani music television series
Pop music television series
Pakistani music